She Ain't Heavy may refer to:

 "She Ain't Heavy" (Dark Angel), an episode of Dark Angel
 "She Ain't Heavy", an episode of The Fresh Prince of Bel-Air
 "She Ain't Heavy", an episode of Jack & Jill (TV series)
 "She Ain't Heavy", an episode of Packed to the Rafters
 "She Ain't Heavy, She's My Cousin", an episode of Doogie Howser, M.D.
 "She Ain't Heavy, She My Mother", an episode of Living Single
 "She Ain't Heavy, She's My Sister", an episode of Hey Dad..!
 "She Ain't Heavy, She's My Partner", an episode of Whoopi

See also 
 He Ain't Heavy (disambiguation)